Catalina Yachts is a U.S.-based builder of fiberglass monohull sloop-rigged sailboats ranging in sizes from eight to 54 feet in length. It was founded in 1969 in Hollywood, California by Frank Butler .
Catalina Yachts is one of the largest boat manufacturers in the world, with over 80,000 boats manufactured to date. Though Catalina produces boats from as small as eight feet under their Capri nameplate, the company is best known for its production of mid-sized cruisers.

History

In 1961, Catalina Yachts founder Frank Butler (January 17, 1928 - November 15, 2020) took over the production of his own boat when his original boat builder ran out of funds and borrowed money from Frank; unable to repay the debt, the builder instead gave Frank the tooling to continue building the boat. Frank ended up taking control of the company, renaming it Wesco Marine and later Coronado Yachts. Many early Coronado 25 boats have the Wesco Marine nameplate on the transom.

Among the first models built by Coronado were the Victory 21 and the Super Satellite. In 1964, the Coronado '25 was produced, becoming the first boat with a one piece interior, making the boat stronger, lighter, and less expensive than previous models. By 1969 the Coronado 27 and 30 foot models were being produced. In 1969, Frank sold Coronado to the Whittaker Corporation which had already acquired Columbia Yachts; Whittaker continued the Coronado line until 1974 producing the Coronado 34 with the center cockpit models 35 and 41. Frank remained with Whitaker for only one year then left to begin Catalina Yachts.

The first model built by Catalina Yachts was a 22-foot design previously rejected by Columbia.  By 1977, Frank had designed and produced three more models: the Catalina 25, Catalina 27, and the Catalina 30.  The Catalina 22 and the Catalina 30 were both inducted into the now-defunct Sail America American Sailboat Hall of Fame in 1995 and 2001 respectively.

In 1978 Catalina developed the Catalina 38 based on molds for a Sparkman & Stephens racing design purchased from the bankrupt Yankee Yacht Company.   Frank redesigned the interior, he gave it a "Catalina deck", a taller mast, a shorter boom, and moved the rudder.

In 1984, Catalina acquired Morgan Yachts and introduced the Catalina Morgan 440 in 2004, now discontinued. The other Morgan models, including the Catalina designed M381 and M45 center cockpit, were recently retired as well.

Catalina Yachts today

Catalina Yachts has produced more than 80,000 boats manufactured to date. Although Catalina produces boats as small as eight feet under the Capri nameplate, the company is known for its production of mid-sized cruisers, generally introducing a newly designed model nearly every year.

Catalina sailboats are manufactured out of its Largo, FL, factory. Although the Catalina brand was built upon sailboats, the recently acquired True North line of outboard motor yachts is the company focus today. After the passing of founder Frank Butler, his former secretary and longtime close personal friend, Sharon Day, was appointed president, chief engineer, head of marine design and CEO by the Butler family. Patric Turner, the company’s longtime national sales manager was appointed COO. He is now general manager and chief foreman of the Florida factory. He currently serves on the Sail America 2022 Board of Directors.

Cruising World "Boat of the Year" winners

 2019 - Catalina 545
 2017 -  Catalina 425
 2014 – Catalina 275 Sport
 2013 – Catalina 315
 2012 – Catalina 385
 2011 – Catalina 355
 2010 – Catalina 445
 2009 – Catalina 375
 2007 – Catalina 309
 2004 – Catalina 440
 2001 – Catalina 390
 1999 – Catalina 310
 1997 – Catalina 380
 1996 – Catalina 28 Mark II
 1995 – Catalina 36 Mark II
 1992 – Catalina 270

Catalina Models

References

Catalina Yachts